Waghur Dam is an earthfill dam located on the Waghur river near Kandari and Varadsim, Jalgaon district in the Indian state of Maharashtra.

The Waghur river flows from its source near Ajanta through the Khandesh region. Work on this major irrigation project was taken up by the Water Resources Department of Maharashtra and began construction in 1978. The dam's main purpose is to supply water for irrigation purpose in downstream area. Canals were built along the left and right banks of the river to meet irrigation needs. In 2006, record rainfall in the catchment area of Waghur was recorded. Nearly 40 TMC of water spilled over the dam.  As of 2008, the dam's reservoir had storage capacity of 8.5 TMC. 

Twenty additional spill gates were planned for the dam, increasing storage capacity by 1.5 TMC.

Specifications
It has a gross storage capacity of 8.5 TMC. The volume is

See also
 List of dams and reservoirs in Maharashtra
 List of dams and reservoirs in India

References

Dams in Jalgaon district
Year of establishment missing